The Servant of God, Juniper, O.F.M., best known as Brother Juniper (died 1258), called "the renowned jester of the Lord," was one of the original followers of St. Francis of Assisi.  Not much is known about Juniper before he joined the friars. In 1210, he was received into the Order of Friars Minor by St. Francis himself.  "Would to God, my brothers, that I had a whole forest of such Junipers," Saint Francis would pun. 

Francis sent him to establish "places" for the friars in Gualdo Tadino and Viterbo. When St. Clare of Assisi was dying, Juniper consoled her. Juniper is buried at Ara Coeli Church at Rome. His feast day is celebrated on 29 January.

St. Junípero Serra (1713–1784), born Miquel Josep Serra i Ferrer, took his religious name in honor of Brother Juniper when he was received into the Order.

The Legend of the Pig's Feet
Several stories about Juniper in the Little Flowers of St. Francis (Fioretti di San Francesco) illustrate his generosity and simplicity. Perhaps the most famous of these is the tale of the pig's feet.

When visiting a poor man who was sick, Juniper asked if he could perform any service for the man. The man told Juniper that he had a longing for a meal of pig's feet, and so Juniper happily ran off to find some. Capturing a pig in a nearby field, he cut off a foot and cooked the meal for the man. When the pig's owner found out about this, he came in great wrath and abused St. Francis and the other Franciscans, calling them thieves and refusing repayment. St. Francis reproached Juniper and ordered him to apologize to the pig's owner and to make amends. Juniper, not understanding why the owner should be upset at such a charitable act, went to him and cheerfully retold the tale of the pig's foot, as though he had done the man a favor.

When the man reacted with anger, Juniper thought that he had misunderstood him, so he simply repeated the story with great zeal, embraced him, and begged the man to give him the rest of the pig for the sake of charity. At this display the owner's heart was changed, and he gave up the rest of the pig to be slaughtered as Juniper had asked. The story of Juniper and the pig's feet was depicted in Roberto Rossellini's film The Flowers of St. Francis (1950).

Other property ownership difficulties 

On another occasion, Juniper was commanded to cease giving part of his clothing to the half-naked people he met on the road. Desiring to obey his superior, Juniper once told a man in need that he couldn’t give the man his tunic, but he wouldn’t prevent the man from taking it either. In time, the friars learned not to leave anything lying around, because Juniper would probably give it away.

See also
 Servant of God Brother Juniper, patron saint archive

References

External links
Patron Saints Index
English Text of the legend of the pig's feet from Little Flowers of St. Francis of Assisi

1190s births
1258 deaths
People from Bevagna
Italian Friars Minor
Roman Catholic religious brothers
12th-century venerated Christians
13th-century venerated Christians
Italian Servants of God
Burials at Santa Maria in Ara Coeli